Richard Glenn Rutan (born July 1, 1938) is a retired United States Air Force officer and fighter pilot, test pilot, and record-breaking aviator who in 1986 piloted the Voyager aircraft on the first non-stop, non-refueled around-the-world flight with co-pilot Jeana Yeager. He was born in Loma Linda, California, where he gained an interest in flying at a young age. He is the older brother of famed aerospace designer Burt Rutan, whose many earlier original designs Dick piloted on class record-breaking flights, including Voyager.

Career

U.S. Air Force
After completing the Radar Intercept Officer Course, Rutan served as a McDonnell F-101B Voodoo Radar Intercept Officer with the 322d Fighter-Interceptor Squadron at Kingsley Field, Oregon, from December 1959 to September 1961, and then as a Northrop F-89 Scorpion Radar Intercept Officer with the 57th Fighter Interceptor Squadron at Keflavik Airport, Iceland, from September 1961 to October 1962. His next assignment was as a Douglas C-124 Globemaster II navigator with the 85th Air Transport Squadron at Travis AFB, California, from October 1962 to November 1965. He underwent Undergraduate Pilot Training, earning his Pilot Wings at Laughlin AFB, Texas, in December 1966.

Vietnam War
Rutan served during the Vietnam War as one of the founding members of the "Mistys" of Operation Commando Sabre, pioneering the use of tactical jets as a "FastFAC" (known as forward air control) for the FAC Airborne mission, which searched for and marked targets with white phosphorus rockets ahead of the strike package. He flew 325 missions but had to eject one time, when his "Hun" North American F-100 Super Sabre aircraft was hit.

Post war
His next assignment was as an F-100 pilot with the 492nd Tactical Fighter Squadron and as a Flight Test Maintenance Officer with the 48th Tactical Fighter Wing at RAF Lakenheath, England, from November 1968 to April 1972. Rutan had to eject a second time in his Air Force career when his aircraft suffered an engine failure over England.
 
He then served as a Flight Test Maintenance Officer with the 3030th Support Squadron at Wright-Patterson AFB, Ohio, from April 1972 to May 1975, followed by service as an LTV A-7 Corsair II pilot and Commander of the 355th Field Maintenance Squadron at Davis-Monthan AFB, Arizona, from May 1975 to August 1976. After completing an Operation Bootstrap degree program, Rutan served as Chief of the Training Division with the 355th Tactical Fighter Wing at Davis-Monthan AFB from January 1977 until his retirement from the Air Force on June 1, 1978.

During his career with the Air Force, Rutan was awarded the Silver Star, five Distinguished Flying Crosses, 16 Air Medals, and a Purple Heart. He retired from the Air Force in 1978 with the rank of lieutenant colonel.

Post military career

Rutan also acted as a test pilot throughout his career, flying multiple designs such as the Fairchild T-46 in 1981 and the XCOR EZ-Rocket in 2001.

From December 14 to December 23, 1986, Rutan flew with Jeana Yeager on the first unrefueled non-stop flight around the world in the Rutan Voyager, a design by his brother Burt. The flight took 9 days, 3 minutes, and 44 seconds and covered 24,986 miles (40,211 km). It attracted world wide media coverage and set multiple records. That same year, Yeager and the Rutan brothers were awarded the Gold Medal of the Royal Aero Club, the Presidential Citizens Medal from President Ronald Reagan, and the Collier Trophy for their achievement.

In 1997, Dick Rutan and Mike Melvill flew two personally-built Rutan Long-EZ kit aircraft side-by-side around the world. This "around the world in 80 nights" flight was called The Spirit of EAA Friendship World Tour, and some legs of it lasted for over 14 hours.

On December 3, 2005, in the EZ-Rocket, Rutan set the point-to-point distance record for a ground-launched, rocket-powered aircraft, flying 16 km from Mojave, California, to California City, California, in just under ten minutes. This was also the first official delivery of U.S. Mail by a rocket-powered aircraft. In recognition of this achievement, the FAI awarded Rutan the 2005 Louis Blériot Medal.

Congressional campaign
In 1992 Rutan ran as a conservative Republican against Democratic congressman George Brown, Jr. in California's 42nd congressional district, consisting mostly of the San Bernardino region of southern California and viewed as a swing district. In the Republican primary, Rutan upset San Bernardino County Supervisor Rob Hammock, who had run a strong race against Brown in 1990. In the general election, Rutan ran on a platform that called for reforming Congress and lowering taxes. Brown, first elected in 1962, was long known for surviving close elections and prevailed with 79,780 votes (50.7%) to Rutan's 69,251 (44%). Fritz Ward, a Libertarian, received 8,424 votes or 5.3% of the vote.

Records
Besides the records Rutan set while flying the XCOR EZ-Rocket (which consisted of a point-to-point distance record and being the first official delivery of U.S. Mail by a rocket-powered aircraft) and while flying Voyager (which consisted of multiple absolute distance records, an airspeed record, and being the first plane to fly non-stop and unrefueled around the world, more than doubling the old distance record set by a Boeing B-52 strategic bomber in 1962), he has also set a number in his personal Rutan VariEze and Long-EZ, including:

FAI class C1b distance over a closed course of 2,636 km at Oshkosh, Wisconsin circa July–August, 1975
FAI class C1b distance over a closed course of 7,725.3 km at Mojave, California on December 15, 1979
FAI class C1b distance of 7,344.56 km from Anchorage, Alaska to Grand Turk Island on June 5, 1981

Rutan believed that by engaging in a program of breaking class records he could further fine-tune his brother's homebuilt aircraft designs.

Awards and honors

Military decorations and medals

Civilian awards
1981 - Louis Bleriot Medal - distance record
1986 - Presidential Citizens Medal (with the rest of the Voyager team: Jeana Yeager and Burt Rutan) 
1986 - Collier Trophy (with Voyager team) - for "the greatest achievement in aeronautics or astronautics"
1986 - De la Vaulx Medal (with Yeager) - around-the-world flight in Voyager
1987 - Louis Bleriot Medal - around-the-world flight
1987 - National Air and Space Museum Trophy (with Yeager)
1988 - Edward Longstreth Medal of the Franklin Institute
2002 - National Aviation Hall of Fame inductee at the National Museum of the United States Air Force
2005 - Louis Bleriot Medal - longest point-to-point rocket plane flight (XCOR EZ-Rocket)
2011 - International Air & Space Hall of Fame inductee at the San Diego Air & Space Museum
2013 - Flying magazine ranked him (along with Yeager) No. 33 on their list of the 51 Heroes of Aviation
2022 - Mojave Air & Space Port is renamed "Rutan Field" in honor of the Rutan brothers' contributions

References

External links

Remarks on Presenting Presidential Citizens Medals to the Designer and Crew of the Voyager in Los Angeles, California - December 29, 1986
Biography in the National Aviation Hall of Fame

1938 births
Living people
United States Air Force personnel of the Vietnam War
American aviation record holders
Amateur radio people
Aviators from California
American test pilots
California Republicans
Collier Trophy recipients
Flight distance record holders
Military personnel from California
National Aviation Hall of Fame inductees
People from Loma Linda, California
Presidential Citizens Medal recipients
Recipients of the Air Medal
Recipients of the Distinguished Flying Cross (United States)
Recipients of the Silver Star
Reedley College alumni
United States Air Force officers
Shot-down aviators
American Vietnam War pilots